Minuscule 842 (in the Gregory-Aland numbering), Θε424 (von Soden), is a 15th-century Greek minuscule manuscript of the New Testament on parchment. The manuscript is lacunose.

Description 
The codex contains the text of the Gospel of Matthew (1:1-20:22; 21:41-60) on 88 parchment leaves (size ). The text is written in one column per page, 43 lines per page.
It contains a commentary.
The manuscript is ornamented.

Text 

Kurt Aland did not place the Greek text of the codex in any Category.
It was not examined by the Claremont Profile Method.

History 

C. R. Gregory dated the manuscript to the 14th century. Currently the manuscript is dated by the INTF to the 14th century.

The manuscript was added to the list of New Testament manuscripts by Gregory (842e). Gregory saw it in 1886.

Currently the manuscript is housed at the Biblioteca Estense (G. 128, a.W.9.26 (III D 9)), in Modena.

See also 

 List of New Testament minuscules
 Biblical manuscript
 Textual criticism
 Minuscule 841

References

Further reading

External links 
 

Greek New Testament minuscules
14th-century biblical manuscripts